George Moussan (born 8 November 1989) is a Swedish footballer who plays as a goalkeeper and is currently a free agent after leaving his most recent Division 1 Norra side Valsta Syrianska IK . He has played one game each for Sweden U17 and Sweden U19 and he was also called up for the Syrian national team in March 2009 for the friendly match against Qatar, but he remained on the bench.

References

External links

Fotbolltransfers profile

1989 births
Living people
Allsvenskan players
Hammarby Fotboll players
Swedish footballers
AFC Eskilstuna players
Association football goalkeepers